Boniérédougou is a town in northeast Ivory Coast. It is a sub-prefecture and commune of Dabakala Department in Hambol Region, Vallée du Bandama District.

In 2014, the population of the sub-prefecture of Boniérédougou was 23,265.

Villages
The 25 villages of the sub-prefecture of Boniérédougou and their population in 2014 are:

Notes

Sub-prefectures of Hambol
Communes of Hambol